James Moffat or Moffatt may refer to:
James C. Moffat, Brisbane chemist and Sunshine Coast pastoralist
James D. Moffat (1846–1916), president of Washington & Jefferson College
James Moffat (author) (1922–1993), author who wrote under several pen names
James Moffat (mathematician) (born 1948), professor of physics, University of Aberdeen
James Moffat (engraver), Scottish engraver
Jim Moffat (born 1960), Scottish footballer
James Moffat (racing driver) (born 1984), Australian racing driver
James Moffatt (1870–1944), Scottish theologian
James Moffatt (rugby), Scottish rugby union and rugby league footballer who played in the 1890s and 1900s